Raleigh Wings was a W-League women's soccer club based out of Raleigh, North Carolina. The team began play in 1998 and folded after the 2000 season.

History
The club was founded in 1998 by the owners of the professional A-League club Raleigh Flyers. In their inaugural season the team amassed a  record, and won the W-1 Championship by beating the Boston Renegades 4–3 at Bowditch Field before 2,180 spectators.

Before the 1999 FIFA Women's World Cup, Raleigh Wings played exhibition games against the national teams of Brazil (a 2–1 defeat) and Russia (a 1–0 win). They retained the W-1 Championship by beating the Chicago Cobras in a shootout after a 2–2 draw in front of a club record 2,260 home crowd at WRAL Soccer Center.

In 2000, Raleigh Wings went  but were defeated by Chicago Cobras in the W-1 Championship final. They lost 4–2 on penalties after a 1–1 draw at WRAL Soccer Center. The club then folded due to the creation of Carolina Courage to play in the Women's United Soccer Association.

Players

Year-by-year

References

External links
Official website

Defunct soccer clubs in North Carolina
Sports in Raleigh, North Carolina
Defunct USL W-League (1995–2015) teams
1998 establishments in North Carolina
2000 disestablishments in North Carolina
Association football clubs established in 1998
Association football clubs disestablished in 2000
Women's sports in North Carolina